Sumo was one of the sports at the 2009 World Games in Kaohsiung and was played between 17 and 18 July. 97 athletes, from 21 nations, participated in the tournament. The competition took place at Kaohsiung Senior High School Gymnasium.

Participating nations

Medal table

Events

Men's events

Women's events

References

External links
 International Sumo Federation
 Sumo on IWGA website
 Results

 
2009 World Games
2009